This is a list of symphonies in D minor written by notable composers.

Baroque and Classical symphonies in D minor usually used 2 horns in F (whereas for most other minor keys 2 or 4 horns were used, half in the tonic and half in the relative major). Michael Haydn's Symphony No. 29 in D minor is notable for using two trumpets in D (the horns are in F but change to D for the coda of the finale). In the Romantic era, D minor symphonies, like symphonies in almost any other key, used horns in F and trumpets in B-flat.

The first choice of clarinet for orchestral music in D minor is naturally the clarinet in B. This choice, however, becomes problematic for multi-movement works that begin in D minor and end in D major, as the clarinet in A would be preferable for the parallel major. One solution is to write the first movement for clarinet in B and the last movement for clarinet in A, but this burdens the player with having to warm up the A instrument in time for the switch.

See also

For symphonies in D major, see List of symphonies in D major. For symphonies in other keys, see List of symphonies by key.

Notes

References
Frisch, Walter, Brahms: The Four Symphonies. New Haven: Yale University Press (2003): 7–10. .

D minor
Symphonies